Glyde may refer to:

 George Glyde (1821–1898), settler of Western Australia
 Henry George Glyde (1906–1998), Canadian painter
 Lavington Glyde (1825–1890), South Australian politician, perhaps not related to Samuel and William
 Rosemary Glyde (1948–1994), violist and composer
 Samuel Dening Glyde (1842–1898), South Australian wheat merchant and politician, brother of William
 Tania Glyde, British novelist
 William Dening Glyde (c. 1826–1901), South Australian wheat merchant and politician, brother of Samuel

as a given name
 Glyde Butler (1932–2000), politician of Victoria, Australia

See also
 Glyde, Pennsylvania
 Glyde Farm Produce
 River Glyde
 Samsung SCH-U940